Opharus intermedia is a moth of the family Erebidae. It was described by Walter Rothschild in 1909. It is found in the Brazilian state of Rio Grande do Sul.

References

Opharus
Moths described in 1909
Moths of South America